Gorosina is a monotypic moth genus of the family Erebidae. Its only species, Gorosina ampla, is known from Costa Rica. Both the genus and species were first described by Schaus in 1913.

References

Herminiinae
Monotypic moth genera